Vicky Kaya (born Vasiliki Kaya, ; 4 July 1978) is a Greek fashion model and television presenter. She has appeared on the covers of numerous international fashion magazines such as Vogue, Esquire, Madame Figaro, Marie Claire, and Elle.

Career

Modelling career beginnings and international success 
Kaya has been modelling since the age of 14. She was spotted in the street, and from there embarked on one of the most successful careers in the fashion world, appearing in many catalogue bookings, campaigns, magazines and television commercials worldwide. At age 18 she moved to Paris where her career took off. She also worked in Milan, Germany and London. Her appearances have been diverse, from the catwalk to television acting. For many years she had been based in New York City and was represented by Wilhelmina Models in New York. She walked the catwalk for such designers as Chanel, Valentino, Christian Dior, Vivienne Westwood and Jean Paul Gaultier.

Over the years she has worked with a plethora of leading designers; she has walked for the greatest designers, has shot hundreds of magazine covers, and has been interviewed by top magazines too (Vogue, Elle, Cosmopolitan, Marie Claire, Wallpaper, InStyle, Dutch, Nylon, Tatler, Harpers and Queen, Red, Madame Figaro, L'Officiel, Esquire, etc.). She has represented a number of companies in major TV campaigns in the USA, Europe and Greece. In the USA and Europe she has done major campaigns for Johnson and Johnson (USA, National Campaign), L'Oreal Paris (France and Eastern Europe), Dove (Europe), Virginia Slims (USA, National Campaign), Garnier Paris, Nivea Body – Nivea Make-up – Nivea Hair (Europe), Schwarzkopf and C&A (Europe).

Television
Since 2006, Kaya has hosted a number of TV shows. From 2009 to 2011, and again from 2018 onwards, she has hosted Greece's Next Top Model and in 2018, the show came back with Kaya as a judge. She also hosts a Greek fashion reality show called "Shopping Star".

Other ventures 
In 2011, she founded The Fashion Workshop, which is the official offshoot of the educational colossus Mod'Art International, where the most eminent and qualified professionals, from all the relevant fields, offer their experience and know-how in fashion to the younger generations, through a unique studies program. Fashion Workshop is based in the centre of Athens and is also certified by the minister of education of Greece.

In 2020, she founded Great for Women, a brand that focuses on women's well-being. Great for Women first product is a multivitamin for women.

Personal life
From 2010 to 2013 Kaya was married to entrepreneur Nikos Krithariotis. In 2013, she began dating entrepreneur Elias Krassas with whom married on 18 July 2014 in Paris, France. Kaya and Krassas have two children: a daughter Bianca-Alexandra (born 25 May 2015) and a son Karolos-Elias (born 20 January 2018).

Filmography

Film

Television

Music videos

Stage

References

External links
 
 

Mass media people from Thessaloniki
1978 births
Greek game show hosts
Greek female models
Greek television actresses
Greek television presenters
Greek voice actresses
Living people
Greek women television presenters
Models from Thessaloniki
Greek expatriates in the United States